Meseșenii de Jos is a commune located in Sălaj County, Crișana, Romania. It is composed of four villages: Aghireș (Egrespatak), Fetindia (Gurzófalva), Meseșenii de Jos and Meseșenii de Sus (Oláhkecel).

In Romanian, Meseșenii de Jos was traditionally known as Cățălul-unguresc. A 1925 law gave it the name Cățelul; this became Cățălu in 1956. The current name dates to 1960. Meseșenii de Sus, historically Cățălul-român, was Cățelușu from 1925 and Cățălușa from 1956, before acquiring its current name in 1960.

Sights 
 Reformed Church in Meseșenii de Jos (construction in the 15th century), historic monument
 Orthodox Church in Meseșenii de Jos (construction 1875)
 Orthodox Church in Meseșenii de Sus (construction 1785), historic monument
 Orthodox Church in Aghireș

References

Communes in Sălaj County
Localities in Crișana